Constantin Duțu (born 8 October 1949) is a Romanian fencer. He competed in the team épée event at the 1972 Summer Olympics.

References

External links
 

1949 births
Living people
Romanian male épée fencers
Olympic fencers of Romania
Fencers at the 1972 Summer Olympics
Sportspeople from Craiova